Suffolk Coastal District Council in Suffolk, England was elected every four years. After the last boundary changes in 2015, 42 councillors were elected from 26 wards. The council was abolished in 2019, with the area becoming part of East Suffolk.

Political control
From the first elections to the council in 1973 until its abolition in 2019, political control of the council was held by the following parties:

Leadership
The leader of the council from 1999 until the council's abolition in 2019 was:

Council elections
1973 Suffolk Coastal District Council election
1976 Suffolk Coastal District Council election
1979 Suffolk Coastal District Council election
1983 Suffolk Coastal District Council election (New ward boundaries)
1987 Suffolk Coastal District Council election (District boundary changes took place but the number of seats remained the same)
1991 Suffolk Coastal District Council election
1995 Suffolk Coastal District Council election
1999 Suffolk Coastal District Council election 
2003 Suffolk Coastal District Council election (New ward boundaries)
2007 Suffolk Coastal District Council election
2011 Suffolk Coastal District Council election
2015 Suffolk Coastal District Council election (New ward boundaries)

By-election results

1995–1999

1999–2003

2003–2007

2007–2011

References

 By-election results

External links
Suffolk Coastal Council

 
Suffolk Coastal
Council elections in Suffolk
District council elections in England